Nina Apollonovna Ponomaryova (née Romashkova; ; 27 April 1929 – 19 August 2016) was a Russian discus thrower and the  first Soviet Olympic champion.

Career
Ponomaryova became interested in athletics in 1947, when she entered the Physical Training Faculty of the Stavropol Pedagogical Institute. Her first official performance was in 1948 at the Stavropol Krai Championships, where she set a new regional record at 30.53 m. After just three years of training she became one of the leading Soviet athletes. In 1949, she finished third at the USSR Championships. At that time an experienced coach Dmitry Markov began to train her. In 1951, Romashkova became the Soviet champion, she repeated this success in 1952–1956, 1958 and 1959.

In 1952, she was a member of the Soviet team, which participated in the Olympic Games for the first time in history. At that time the Olympic record was held since 1936 Summer Olympics by Gisela Mauermayer at 47.63 m. Ponomaryova won the qualifying round with a throw of 45.05 m (36 m was enough to qualify). In the final, after the first try Ponomaryova was second with a throw of 45.16 m, the leader being her teammate Nina Dumbadze (45.85 m). In the second try Ponomaryova improved the Olympic record by more than 3 metres (50.84 m). After that she was the leader until the end of the competition. In the third try she set the Olympic record at 51.42 m and earned the first Olympic gold medal for the Soviet Union.

Less than a month after the 1952 Summer Olympics, on 9 August 1952 in Odessa, Ponomaryova set a new world record at 53.61 m. In 1954, she won a European title, and in 1956 an Olympic bronze medal. In 1957, she was awarded the Order of the Red Banner of Labour. In 1960, Ponomaryova became an Olympic champion for the second time. In 1966 she finished her career and worked as a coach, first in Kiev, and after 1998 in Moscow.

Personal life
Soon after the 1952 Olympics, Ponomaryova married and gave birth to a son.

Quote
Only after I had felt a heavy golden circle in my hand, I realized what happened. I am the first Soviet Olympic Champion, you know, the first record-holder of the 15th Olympiad...Tears were stinging my eyes. How happy I was!... After her win at the 1952 Summer Olympics.

In Russian:Только ощутив в руке тяжелый золотой кружок, я осознала, что произошло. Ведь я первая советская олимпийская чемпионка, первая рекордсменка XV Олимпиады... Слезы щипали глаза. Как я была счастлива!...

References

External links

 Romashkova-Ponomaryova rzutyiskoki.pl 
 Nina Ponomaryova's profile in the Modern Museum of Sports includes photos of her and some of her decorations 
 Biography 

1929 births
2016 deaths
Olympic athletes of the Soviet Union
Olympic gold medalists for the Soviet Union
Olympic bronze medalists for the Soviet Union
Athletes (track and field) at the 1952 Summer Olympics
Athletes (track and field) at the 1956 Summer Olympics
Athletes (track and field) at the 1960 Summer Olympics
Athletes (track and field) at the 1964 Summer Olympics
Soviet female discus throwers
Russian female discus throwers
Recipients of the Order of the Red Banner of Labour
European Athletics Championships medalists
Sportspeople from Yekaterinburg
Medalists at the 1960 Summer Olympics
Medalists at the 1956 Summer Olympics
Medalists at the 1952 Summer Olympics
Olympic gold medalists in athletics (track and field)
Olympic bronze medalists in athletics (track and field)
Burials at the Federal Military Memorial Cemetery